Josef Škvorecký  (September 27, 1924 – January 3, 2012) was a Czech-Canadian writer and publisher. He spent half of his life in Canada, publishing and supporting banned Czech literature during the communist era. Škvorecký was awarded the Neustadt International Prize for Literature in 1980. He and his wife were long-time supporters of Czech dissident writers before the fall of communism in that country. Škvorecký's fiction deals with several themes: the horrors of totalitarianism and repression, the expatriate experience, and the miracle of jazz.

Life
Born the son of a bank clerk in Náchod, Czechoslovakia, Škvorecký graduated in 1943 from the Reálné gymnasium in his native Náchod. He had a youthful love-affair with jazz and was an amateur tenor saxophone player in the period just prior to the Second World War, an experience he drew upon for his novella The Bass Saxophone (1967). For two years during the War he was a slave labourer in a Messerschmitt aircraft factory in Náchod.

After the war, he began to study at the Faculty of Medicine of Charles University in Prague, but after his first term he moved to the Faculty of Arts, where he studied philosophy and graduated in 1949. In 1951 he gained a PhD in philosophy. He then taught for two years at the Social School for Girls in Hořice v Podkrkonoší. Between 1952 and 1954 he performed his military service in the Czechoslovak Army.

He worked briefly as a teacher, editor and translator in the 1950s. In this period he completed several novels including his first novel The Cowards (written 1948–49, published 1958) and The End of the Nylon Age (1956). They were condemned and banned by the Communist authorities after their publication. His prose style, open-ended and improvisational, was an innovation, but this and his democratic ideals were a challenge to the Communist regime. As a result, he lost his job as editor of the magazine Světová literatura ("World Literature"). Škvorecký kept writing, and helped nurture the democratic movement that culminated in the Prague Spring in 1968.

After the Warsaw Pact invasion of Czechoslovakia that year, Škvorecký and his wife, writer and actress Zdena Salivarová, fled to Canada.

In 1971, he and his wife founded 68 Publishers which, over the next 20 years, published banned Czech and Slovak books. The imprint became an important mouthpiece for dissident writers, such as Václav Havel, Milan Kundera, and Ludvík Vaculík, among many others. For providing this critical literary outlet, the president of post-Communist Czechoslovakia, Václav Havel, later awarded the couple the Order of the White Lion in 1990.

He taught at the Department of English at the University of Toronto where he was eventually appointed Professor Emeritus of English and Film. He retired in 1990. In Canada, he is considered to be a Canadian author despite the fact that he is mostly published in Czech.

Literary works
Most of Škvorecký's novels are available in English: the novels The Cowards, Miss Silver's Past, The Republic of Whores, The Miracle Game, The Swell Season, The Engineer of Human Souls which won a Canadian Governor General's Award, The Bride of Texas, Dvořák in Love, The Tenor Saxophonist's Story, Two Murders in My Double Life, An Inexplicable Story or The Narrative of Questus Firmus Siculus, his selected short stories When Eve Was Naked and the two short novels The Bass Saxophone and Emöke. A recurring character in several of his novels is Danny Smiricky, who is a partial self-portrait of the author.

He wrote four books of detective stories featuring Lieutenant Boruvka of the Prague Homicide Bureau: The Mournful Demeanor of Lieutenant Boruvka, Sins for Father Knox, The End of Lieutenant Boruvka and The Return of Lieutenant Boruvka.

His poetry was published as a collection in 1999 as ...there's no remedy for this pain (...na tuhle bolest nejsou prášky).

His non-fiction works include Talkin' Moscow Blues, a book of essays on jazz, literature and politics, an autobiography Headed for the Blues, and two books on the Czech cinema including All the Bright Young Men and Women.

In Middle Europe, he was also a well-known Cthulhu Mythos expert, who wrote many prefaces to H. P. Lovecraft's works.

Škvorecký wrote for films and television. The feature film The Tank Battalion was adapted from his novel The Republic of Whores. Other features, written for Prague TV, include Eine kleine Jazzmusik, adapted from his story of the same name, The Emöke Legend from a novella of the same name, and a two-hour TV drama Poe and the Murder of a Beautiful Girl, based on Edgar Allan Poe's story The Mystery of Marie Roget. Three very successful TV serials were made from his stories: Sins for Father Knox, The Swell Season and Murders for Luck.

A film version of the novel Pastor's End was produced in 1968, but was never shown and went straight into locked Communist archives due to the fact that its author "illegally" fled the country. In the spring and summer of 1968 Škvorecký and the Czech film director Miloš Forman jointly wrote a script synopsis to make a film version of The Cowards. After Škvorecký fled the Warsaw Pact invasion the synopsis was translated into English, but no film was made. In the 21st century the English translation was translated back into Czech and has been published.

Prominent in his writing for radio was a long-running monthly series on literature for Voice of America. From 1973 to 1990 he wrote more than 200 of these shows covering notable literary works and discussing literary themes.

He died on January 3, 2012, in Toronto, Ontario, from cancer; he was 87 years old.

Awards
Among his numerous literary awards are the Neustadt International Prize for Literature (1980), the Canadian Governor General's Award for English-language fiction (1984), the Czech Republic State Prize for Literature (1999), the Prize of the Comenius Pangea Foundation "For Improvement of Human Affairs" (2001) which he received with the Polish film director Andrzej Wajda as well as the Angelus Award (2009).

Nominated for the Nobel Prize in 1982.

Awarded the Order of the White Lion by the President of Czechoslovakia, Václav Havel, 1990.

In 1992 he was made a Member of the Order of Canada.

Škvorecký was a Guggenheim Fellow, and a Fellow of the Royal Society of Canada.

Chevalier de l'Ordre des Arts et des Lettres, République Française, 1996.

Selected bibliography
Novels
 Konec nylonového věku (End of the Nylon Age), 1956 (banned by censors)
 Zbabělci (The Cowards), 1958
 Lvíče (The Lion Cub, translated into English as Miss Silver's Past), 1969
 Tankový prapor (The Tank Battalion, translated into English as The Republic of Whores), 1969
 Mirákl (The Miracle Game), 1972
 Prima sezóna (The Swell Season), 1975
 Konec poručíka Borůvky (The End of Lieutenant Boruvka), 1975
 Příběh inženýra lidských duší (The Engineer of Human Souls), 1977
 Návrat poručíka Borůvky (The Return of Lieutenant Boruvka), 1980
 Scherzo capriccioso (translated into English as Dvorak in Love), 1984 - story about Antonín Dvořák's time in America as director of the National Conservatory for Music.
 Nevěsta z Texasu (The Bride from Texas), 1992
 Dvě vraždy v mém dvojím životě (Two Murders in My Double Life), 1999
 Nevysvětlitelný příběh aneb Vyprávění Questa Firma Sicula (An Inexplicable Story, or, The Narrative of Questus Firmus Siculus), 1998
 Krátké setkání, s vraždou (Brief Encounter, with Murder), 1999, co-written with Zdena Salivarová
 Setkání po letech, s vraždou (Encounter After Many Years, with Murder), 2001, co-written with Zdena Salivarová
 Setkání na konci éry, s vraždou (Encounter at the End of an Era, with Murder), 2001, co-written with Zdena Salivarová
 Obyčejné źivoty (Ordinary Lives), 2004

Novellas
 Legenda Emöke (The Legend of Emöke), 1963
 Bassaxofon (The Bass Saxophone), 1967

Collections of short stories
 Sedmiramenný svícen (The Menorah), 1964
 Ze života lepší společnosti (The Life of High Society), 1965
 Smutek poručíka Borůvky (The Mournful Demeanour of Lieutenant Boruvka), 1966
 Babylónský příběh a jiné povídky ('A Babylonian Story and Other Stories), 1967
 Hořkej svět (The Bitter World), 1969
 Hříchy pro pátera Knoxe (Sins for Father Knox), 1973
 Ze života české společnosti (The Life of Czech Society), 1985
 Povídky tenorsaxofonisty (The Tenor Saxophonist's Story), 1993
 Povídky z Rajského údolí (The Edenvale Stories), 1996
 When Eve Was Naked, 2000

Collections of essays
 Nápady čtenáře detektivek (Reading Detective Stories), 1965
 O nich – o nás (They – That Is: Us), 1968
 Samožerbuch (The Book of Self-Praise), 1977
 All the Bright Young Men and Women (English translation of Všichni ti bystří mladí muži a ženy), 1972
 Na brigádě (Working Overtime), 1979
 Jirí Menzel and the History of the Closely Watched Trains, 1982
 Talkin' Moscow Blues, 1988
 Franz Kafka, jazz a jiné marginálie (Franz Kafka, Jazz and other Marginal Matters), 1988
  ... In the lonesome October, 1994
 Le Camarade Joueur de jazz, 1996

References

External links
 Biography and Bibliography
 Biography by Jan Čulík
  (papers held at the Hoover Institution Archives)

1924 births
2012 deaths
Canadian male novelists
Czechoslovak expatriates in Canada
Czech publishers (people)
Czech translators
Czech male writers
Czechoslovak defectors
Academic staff of the University of Toronto
Governor General's Award-winning fiction writers
Members of the Order of Canada
People from Náchod
Recipients of the Order of the White Lion
20th-century translators
20th-century Canadian novelists
Fellows of the Royal Society of Canada
Czechoslovak World War II forced labourers
Charles University alumni